Ranilug (Serbian Cyrillic: Ранилуг) or Ranillug, is a village and municipality located in the Gjilan District of Kosovo. The municipality comprises 12 villages and as of 2015 has a population of 5,800 inhabitants.

After the 2013 Brussels Agreement, the municipality became part of the Community of Serb Municipalities.

History

Until 2010, Ranilug was part of Kamenica municipality. On 5 January 2010, the constitutive municipal assembly session was held and Ranilug became newly established municipality. Although the new municipality is primarily inhabited by Serbs, this move was not recognized by the Government of Serbia, which does not recognize the Republic of Kosovo, and therefore its administrative changes.

After the 2013 Brussels Agreement between the governments of Kosovo and Serbia, Serbia recognized the municipalities and the Kosovo's governance of the territory, and agreed to create a Community of Serb Municipalities, which will operate within the Kosovo legal framework.

Settlements
Aside from the village of Ranilug, the municipality includes the following villages:

 Bozevce
 Domorovce
 Drenovce
 Glogovce
 Odevce
 Gornje Korminjane
 Donje Korminjane
 Pančelo
 Rajanovce
 Veliko Ropotovo
 Malo Ropotovo
 Tomance

Demographics
According to the 2011 census done by the Government of Kosovo, the municipality of Ranilug has 3,900 inhabitants. However, in 2015 report by OSCE, the population of Ranilug municipality stands at 5,800 inhabitants, including internally displaced persons.

Ethnic groups
The municipality of Ranilug is largely composed of Kosovo Serbs majority (98.5%), with minority Kosovo Albanians (1.4%). Albanians reside in two villages: Veliko Ropotovo (Ropotovë e Madhe) and Donje Korminjane (Korminjani).

The ethnic composition of the municipality including IDPs is as follows:

Economy
The economy of Ranilug is mainly based on small businesses, dairy production and agriculture.

Public services and infrastructure
One municipal health center as well as eight health houses operate in the municipality. In 2011 a new police station was inaugurated, with 22 police officers.

The education system of the municipality consists of one kindergarten, two primary and two secondary schools.

See also
 Municipalities of Kosovo
 Community of Serb Municipalities

Notes and references
Notes

References

External links

 Official website

Populated places in Kosovo
Municipalities of Kosovo
Community of Serb Municipalities
Serbian enclaves in Kosovo